Solidago latissimifolia, common name Elliott's goldenrod, is North American species of flowering plants in the family Asteraceae. It is native to the Atlantic Coast of the United States and Canada, from Nova Scotia south to Alabama and Florida.

One plant can produce as many as 800 small yellow flower heads, in large branching arrays at the tops of the stems. The species grows in marshes (fresh water or brackish water) and thickets on the coastal plain.

Conservation status in the United States
It is listed as endangered in New York, and as a species of special concern in  Rhode Island. It is a special concern and believed extirpated in Connecticut.

References

External links
 
 

latissimifolia
Flora of Nova Scotia
Flora of the Eastern United States
Plants described in 1768
Taxa named by Philip Miller
Flora without expected TNC conservation status